Corinne Bailey Rae is the debut studio album by English singer-songwriter Corinne Bailey Rae, released on 24 February 2006 by EMI. The album debuted at number one on the UK Albums Chart and has been certified triple platinum by the British Phonographic Industry (BPI). Four singles were released from the album: "Like a Star", "Put Your Records On", "Trouble Sleeping" and "I'd Like To". Corinne Bailey Rae has sold over four million copies worldwide.

Release and promotion
"Like a Star" was released as the album's lead single in a limited-edition format in 2005, peaking at number 34 on the UK Singles Chart. When re-released in October 2006, "Like a Star" reached a new peak position of number 32 on the UK chart. The second single, "Put Your Records On", peaked at number two in February 2006. "Trouble Sleeping" was released as the album's third single in May 2006, peaking at number 40 in the UK.

"I'd Like To" was released on 12 February 2007 as the fourth and final single. On the same day, the album was re-released with a bonus disc containing some of the B-sides and remixes included on previous singles, as well as three new tracks—one of which, a cover of Björk's 1993 song "Venus as a Boy", only previously appeared on a covermount for Q magazine. Several songs from the album appear in the 2006 comedy-drama film Venus starring Peter O'Toole. In the United States, "Breathless" was released as a promotional single in 2007.

Commercial performance
Corinne Bailey Rae debuted at number one on the UK Albums Chart, selling 108,181 copies in its first week. The album had sold 968,341 copies in the United Kingdom by May 2016, earning a triple platinum certification from the British Phonographic Industry (BPI) on 22 July 2013.

The album debuted at number 17 on the Billboard 200 in the United States, selling 40,000 copies in its first week. On the issue dated 3 March 2007, it peaked at number four with 120,000 copies sold. The album was certified platinum by the Recording Industry Association of America (RIAA) on 5 December 2006, and had sold 1.9 million copies in the US by January 2010. As of October 2009, Corinne Bailey Rae had sold over four million copies worldwide.

Critical reception

Corinne Bailey Rae received generally positive reviews from music critics. At Metacritic, which assigns a normalised rating out of 100 to reviews from mainstream publications, the album received an average score of 69, based on 13 reviews. While some critics perceived filler as a weakness of the album, Bailey Rae earned positive comparisons to female recording artists such as Billie Holiday, Norah Jones, Erykah Badu, Minnie Riperton, and Macy Gray. David Jeffries of AllMusic called it "pleasingly homegrown, warm, and poignant in parts". Los Angeles Times writer Natalie Nichols compared Bailey Rae's music to that of Sade and Stevie Wonder. Michael Endelman of Entertainment Weekly called it "extremely agreeable, a bit predictable, and occasionally irresistible". MusicOMH writer Michael Hubbard called the debut "exceptional in every way" and "a breath of fresh air" Preston Jones of Slant Magazine was more lukewarm, saying "Rae’s amiable competence marks her as a talent worth keeping tabs on, but the strength of Corinne Bailey Rae is fleeting, a triumph of mood over tangible substance."

In contrast, Neil Spencer of The Observer gave the album a scathing review, saying "Beyond her calling card single, 'Like a Star', however, she shows a lack of ambition. The arrangements are generic (Al Green's leftovers, mostly), the cooing backing singers bland, and the lyrics pedestrian."

Paste listed the album as the 41st best of 2006.

Accolades
Bailey Rae received a nomination for Best UK & Ireland Act at the 2006 MTV Europe Music Awards. That same year, she won two MOBO Awards for Best UK Newcomer and Best UK Female, as well as a Mojo Award for Best New Act. Bailey Rae won Outstanding New Artist at the 2007 NAACP Image Awards, and was nominated for Outstanding Female Artist and Outstanding Album. At the 2007 Grammy Awards, Bailey Rae received a nomination for Best New Artist, while "Put Your Records On" was nominated for Record of the Year and Song of the Year. The following year, Bailey Rae was nominated for another Grammy Award for Song of the Year for "Like a Star", and "Put Your Records On" won an ASCAP Award for Song of the Year.

Track listing

Notes
  signifies an additional producer
  signifies a remixer
  signifies a main and additional producer

Personnel
Credits adapted from the liner notes of Corinne Bailey Rae.

Musicians

 Corinne Bailey Rae – vocals, backing vocals ; acoustic guitar ; Spanish guitar ; percussion ; electric guitar ; bass, piano ; Moog, additional keyboards 
 Paul Siddal – keys 
 Steve Chrisanthou – organ ; programming ; electric guitar ; Spanish guitar, horn sampling, percussion ; piano 
 The London Session Orchestra – strings 
 Gavyn Wright – director of The London Session Orchestra 
 Wil Malone – string arrangement and conducting 
 Rod Bowkett – bass, acoustic guitar 
 John Beck – keyboard 
 Joe Tatton – Hammond organ 
 Cara Robinson – additional backing vocals 
 Jason Rae – alto saxophone ; baritone saxophone ; flute 
 Jim Corry – tenor saxophone 
 Malcolm Strachan – trumpet 
 Sam Dixon – bass 
 Paul Herman – guitar, drum programming ; acoustic guitar, electric guitar 
 Aubrey Nunn – bass guitar 
 Jess Bailey – Wurlitzer piano, Hammond organ 
 Justin Broad – drum programming 
 Kenny Higgins – bass guitar 
 Steve Bush – electric guitar, bass, programming 
 Andy Platts – Fender Rhodes, additional guitar 
 Steve Brown – Hammond organ, additional Fender Rhodes ; backing vocals, Jupiter synths, music box sampling, Wurlitzer piano 
 Andrew Hale – grand piano, programming 
 Pete Lewinson – drums 
 Kenji Jammer – electric guitar, acoustic guitar 
 Colin Waterman – drums 
 Paul McKendrick – additional backing vocals 
 Livingston Brown – bass guitar 
 Tommy D – keys, drum programming 
 Mikey Lawrence – drums, percussion 
 John Ellis – glockenspiel, backing vocals 
 Yvonne Ellis – programming

Technical

 Steve Chrisanthou – recording, production ; additional production ; mixing 
 Jeremy Wheatley – mixing 
 Rod Bowkett – additional production 
 Justin Broad – engineering ; production 
 Jimmy Hogarth – additional production 
 Paul Herman – mixing, production 
 Steve Bush – production 
 Andrew Hale – production 
 Mike Pela – mixing 
 David Ayers – engineering 
 Ian Duncan – engineering 
 Tommy D – production, mixing 
 Steve Brown – additional recording, production 
 Yvonne Ellis – engineering 
 Dan Hope – additional recording 
 RKW – production

Artwork
 Irene Rukerebuka – design, photography
 Darren Lewis – artwork
 Emma Hardy – additional photography inside booklet

Charts

Weekly charts

Year-end charts

Certifications

Release history

Notes

References

2006 debut albums
Corinne Bailey Rae albums
EMI Records albums
European Border Breakers Award-winning albums